The Women's rhythmic individual all-around competition at the 2016 Summer Olympics was held at the Arena Olímpica do Rio.

The medals were presented by Alexander Zhukov, IOC member, Russia, and Nataliya Kuzmina, President of the Rhythmic Gymnastics Technical Committee of the FIG, Russia.

Competition format
The competition consisted of a qualification round and a final round. The top ten gymnasts in the qualification round advanced to the final round. In each round, the gymnasts performed four routines (ball, hoop, clubs, and ribbon), with the scores added to give a total.

Qualification

Final

References

rhythmic individual all-around
2016
2016 in women's gymnastics
Women's events at the 2016 Summer Olympics